The Missionary District of Western Nebraska was a missionary district of the Episcopal Church in the United States of America.

History
The diocese was constituted in 1889 when it was split off from the Diocese of Nebraska and named the Missionary District of The Platte. In 1898 it was renamed the Missionary District of Laramie,  with the addition of eastern Wyoming, and in 1907 it became the Missionary District of Kearney, and in 1913 it was named the Missionary District of Western Nebraska.The diocese was recombined with the Episcopal Diocese of Nebraska in 1946.

In 1918, St. Mark's in Hastings was designated pro-cathedral for the Western Nebraska district. It continues to hold that designation, although the district was absorbed into the Diocese of Nebraska.

Bishops of the Diocese
Anson Rogers Graves (1890-1910)
George Allen Beecher (1910-1943)

References

Further reading
Bishop Graves's autobiography, The Farmer Boy who Became a Bishop
The Episcopal Church Annual, Morehouse Publishing: New York, NY (2005).

External links
Episcopal Diocese of Nebraska
Official Web site of the Episcopal Church
Journal of the Annual Convocation

Western Nebraska
Missionary District of Western Nebraska
Religious organizations established in 1889
Organizations disestablished in 1944
Former Anglican dioceses
1944 disestablishments in Nebraska